The World Is Yours 2 is the second studio album by American rapper Rich the Kid. It was released through Interscope Records and Rich Forever Music on March 22, 2019, and follows its predecessor, The World Is Yours (2018). The album features guest appearances from Big Sean, YoungBoy Never Broke Again, Lil Pump, Takeoff, Offset, Tory Lanez, Young Thug, Gunna, Miguel, A Boogie wit da Hoodie, Jay Critch, Nav, and Ty Dolla Sign.

Background
On September 25, 2018, Rich the Kid announced that he had completed his next album, tweeting that he had just "finished the album of the century".

Rich the Kid announced the album's release date on Twitter in November 2018. He later shared a preview of an unnamed track in an Instagram timeline post.

The tracklist was announced by frequent collaborator Migos via their Instagram story on January 3, 2019.

The artwork was unveiled via Twitter on January 10, 2019, and originally scheduled to release on January 18, 2019, but was delayed. The new release date was announced on February 28, 2019.

Artwork
The album's artwork features Rich the Kid donning an all-black attire. Rich takes the money-stack from the predecessor, The World Is Yours (2018) and trades it for a shiny representation for "the world", thus perfecting the metaphor of the album title.

The title of the album also comes from the film Scarface as the predecessor, The World Is Yours (2018).

Singles
The lead single, "Splashin" was released on December 4, 2018. The music video was released on January 9, 2019.

The second single, "4 Phones" was released on March 1, 2019, with an accompanied music video.

The third single, "Tic Toc" with Tory Lanez was released on March 14, 2019.

The fourth single, "Save That" was released to rhythmic contemporary radio on May 28, 2019.

Promotional
The lead promotional single, "Nasty", was released on October 4, 2018, with an accompanied music video.

The second promotional single, "Mo Paper" featuring YG, was released on October 25, 2018. It was later followed by a "farm-themed" music video.

Commercial performance
The World Is Yours 2 debuted at number four on the US Billboard 200 with 42,000 album-equivalent units (including 2,000 pure album sales) in its first week. It is Rich the Kid's second US top 10 album.

Track listing

Notes
  signifies a co-producer
  signifies an uncredited co-producer

Personnel
 Dexter Randall – recording 
 Johann Chavez – recording 
 Michael "Mikfly Dottin – mixing 
 Colin Leonard – mastering

Charts

Weekly charts

Year-end charts

References

2019 albums
Rich the Kid albums
Albums produced by Frank Dukes
Albums produced by Louis Bell
Albums produced by Nard & B
Albums produced by Ricky Racks
Albums produced by T-Minus (record producer)
Interscope Records albums
Sequel albums